The Jefferson Park Transit Center is an intermodal passenger transport hub in the Jefferson Park neighborhood of Chicago, Illinois. It serves as a station for rail and also as a bus terminal. Jefferson Park Transit Center's railroad station is on Metra's Union Pacific Northwest Line, with the station located at 4963 North Milwaukee Avenue.

As of April 25, 2022, Metra's Jefferson Park station is served by 52 trains (25 inbound, 27 outbound) on weekdays, by 31 trains (16 inbound, 15 outbound) on Saturdays, and by 19 trains (nine inbound, 10 outbound) on Sundays.

It is also an 'L' station on the Blue Line, which stops at a single island platform in the median of the Kennedy Expressway at 4917 North Milwaukee Avenue. Blue Line trains run 24 hours a day, 7 days a week, with intervals of as little as 2–7 minutes during rush hour, and take 25 minutes to travel to the Loop. From 1970 to 1983, this was the terminal for West-Northwest Line trains once the service was extended from Logan Square.

Station layout

History
The original Jefferson Park Station was built in the late 1850s, by the Chicago, St. Paul and Fond du Lac Railroad at ground level, and became part of the Chicago and North Western Railway when the CStP&F went bankrupt in 1859. C&NW raised it above ground in 1958. On February 1, 1970, Jefferson Park's 'L' station opened as the northwestern terminus of the Kennedy Expressway extension of the CTA's Milwaukee Line (now the Blue Line), as an addition to the Jefferson Park Chicago & North Western depot. The station was designed by Skidmore, Owings and Merrill. The station was renovated in 2000–2001, and an elevator added to aid access. In 2005, a monument to Thomas Jefferson was placed along the station's entrance along Milwaukee Avenue.

Structure
The Metra station has three tracks, a side platform for the inbound local track, and an island platform for the center express track and outbound local track. As of April 25, 2022, one train in each peak period stops at Jefferson Park on the center track. A station house open from 5:00 A.M. to 1:00 P.M. is located on the inbound platform. There is no ticket agent at Jefferson Park, so tickets must be purchased on board the train. Jefferson Park has a park and ride lot operated by Imperial Parking.

The Blue Line station is located in the median of the Kennedy Expressway, and like all other stations on this segment, has two tracks and one island platform. A middle track exists in between the operating tracks from the station to Foster Avenue, and is used for short-turning trains during weekday rush hours. The middle track is a remnant of a small storage yard that existed from 1970 to 1983 when Jefferson Park was the line's northern terminus.

Jefferson Park Transit Center Modernization  project 
The $25 million project began at the Jefferson Park Transit Center on October 1, 2018, and was completed on July 23, 2019.

Bus connections
CTA
56 Milwaukee
68 Northwest Highway
81 Lawrence (Owl Service)
81W West Lawrence
85 Central
85A North Central (Monday-Saturday only)
88 Higgins
91 Austin
92 Foster
X98 Avon Express (Weekday Shift Changes only)

Pace
225 Central/Howard (Weekday Rush Hours only)
226 Oakton Street (Weekdays only)
270 Milwaukee Avenue
Pulse Milwaukee Line

Image gallery

References

External links

Jefferson Park Transit Center (Chicago 'L'.org)
Northwest Chicago Historical Society Newsletter devoted to Jefferson Park's role as a transit hub

Milwaukee Avenue entrance (North Bus Terminal) from Google Maps Street View
Milwaukee Avenue entrance (South Bus Terminal and Thomas Jefferson Statue) from Google Maps Street View
Argyle Street entrance to Metra from Google Maps Street View

Metra stations in Chicago
CTA Blue Line stations
Railway stations in the United States opened in 1970
Transit centers in the United States
Former Chicago and North Western Railway stations
Railway stations in highway medians